Ibrahim Tall (born 23 June 1981) is a Senegalese international footballer who plays for FC Meyrin. He is a versatile defender capable of playing either right back or centre back.

Club career

Early career
Tall was born in Aubervilliers, Paris. He started his career with CS Louhans-Cuiseaux before moving to FC Sochaux-Montbéliard in 2002. He soon became a regular for the Montbéliard club, making over 70 first team appearances and helping them to win the 2004 Coupe de la Ligue. He also participated in the Montbéliard club's runs to the 2004 UEFA Cup quarter-finals and the 2003 Coupe de la Ligue Final.

Hearts
Tall moved to Hearts in August 2005 in controversial circumstances, with tabloids speculating that he was signed by club owner Vladimir Romanov, against the wishes of then head coach George Burley. Commenting on the signings of Tall and Brazilian Samuel Camazzola, Burley himself would only admit that the situation was "not ideal". Tall then appeared to become the victim of internal club politics as, despite his reported £8,000 per week salary, he spent the first 7 months of his Hearts career either sitting on the bench or in the stand.

An injury to José Gonçalves and the omission from the team of Andy Webster, due to a contract dispute with the club, eventually allowed Tall to make his competitive debut, as a substitute, in the 2–0 victory over Kilmarnock on 15 April. After this, he formed a solid defensive partnership with club captain Steven Pressley during the final weeks of the 2005–06 season and ended it on a positive note, when he collected his first senior medal as Hearts defeated Gretna in the Scottish Cup final.

On 26 July, Tall scored his first competitive goal for Hearts, in the club's first game in Europe's elite club competition, the UEFA Champions League. His strike against Bosnian club NK Široki Brijeg helped his side to a 3–0 aggregate victory.

On 15 May 2008, it was announced that Tall had left Hearts.

Return to France
On 10 June 2008 Tall returned to France with newly promoted FC Nantes, signing a two-year contract with the Ligue 1 side.

Later career
On 31 July 2010, he signed a two-year contract with Larissa. After one and half years with the Greek club, Tall left on a free transfer and joined Swiss side FC Lausanne-Sport in February 2012. Tall made 22 (1 as sub) appearances in the 2012–13 season but appeared to have been released for the 2013–14 season.

International career
Tall has appeared over twenty times for the Senegal national team. Despite his French birth and upbringing, he qualifies to represent the African state through his parents' Senegalese lineage.

Honours
 Coupe de la Ligue: 2003–04
 Scottish Cup: 2005–06

References

External links
 
 
 

1981 births
Living people
French sportspeople of Senegalese descent
Association football defenders
Senegalese footballers
French footballers
Senegal international footballers
Expatriate footballers in Scotland
Expatriate footballers in Greece
Expatriate footballers in Switzerland
Ligue 1 players
Ligue 2 players
Scottish Premier League players
Swiss Super League players
Louhans-Cuiseaux FC players
FC Sochaux-Montbéliard players
Heart of Midlothian F.C. players
FC Nantes players
Athlitiki Enosi Larissa F.C. players
FC Lausanne-Sport players
FC Le Mont players
FC Stade Nyonnais players
FC Meyrin players